Knepp Wildland is the first major lowland rewilding project in England. It comprises  of former arable and dairy farmland in the grounds of Knepp Castle, in West Sussex, England. 

Since 2000 when the conversion from intensive agriculture started the land now supports an 'extraordinary abundance' of many rare species including turtle doves, barbastelle bats, slow-worms and grass snakes; it has become a major nesting site for nightingales; a breeding hotspot for purple emperor butterflies; the site of the first white stork chicks raised in the wild in England for 600 years, and is home to the first beavers living in the wild in Sussex for 400 years. On 17 November 2021 the very rare Vagrant Emperor dragonfly (Anax ephippiger) was discovered in Pond Field.

History

After inheriting the 3,500 acre farm from his grandparents at the age of 21 in 1987, Sir Charles Burrell, 10th Baronet tried to run the farm profitably for 17 years. In 2000 he reluctantly decided to sell the dairy herd and farm equipment to clear mounting debts rather than take on even more debt in yet another attempt to increase the productivity. The turning-point came in 2001, when he received Countryside Stewardship funding to restore the 350 acre Repton-designed parkland around the mansion; parkland that had been ploughed since World War II.

In 2001 the  Repton park around the old castle was seeded with grass seed and a local wild meadow seed mix; by the end of the year all the internal fences had been removed from the park and deer from Petworth House had been introduced.

Further inspired by a visit to the Oostvaardersplassen nature reserve in the Netherlands in 2002 and by the work of Dutch ecologist Dr Frans Vera, Burrell set about establishing a 'hands-off', naturalistic grazing system across the entire estate. He used free-roaming herds of old English longhorns, Exmoor ponies and Tamworth pigs as proxies for the aurochs, tarpan and wild boar that would once have roamed the British countryside, as well as red and fallow deer.

In 2003 the project received additional funding from the Countryside Stewardship Scheme to extend the park restoration to all of the Middle Block and also the Northern Block. English Long Horn Cattle were added in the same year. along with 6 Exmoor ponies. Two Tamworth sows followed, along with a further 23 Longhorn Cattle in the Northern Block in 2004.

By 2006  of the Southern Block had been left completely unmanaged for between 1 and 6 years. The first meeting of the steering group was held the same year.
 
In 2009 Ravens nested at Knepp for the first time in hundreds of years; 13 out of a total of 18 UK bat species were recorded that summer along with 15 ‘UK Biodiversity Action Plan Priority Species' (4 bats and 11 birds) and 60 invertebrate species of conservation importance and 76 additional species of moths. By March 2009 a 9-mile-long perimeter fence around the Southern Block had been completed and 53 Longhorn Cattle were introduced to the area, followed shortly afterwards by 23 Exmoor Ponies, 20 Tamworth pigs and 42 Fallow deer. Purple Emperor Butterflies were spotted for the first time at Knepp that year, and by 2015 it had become the largest breeding colony of Purple Emperors in the country.

In 2010 the project received Higher Level Environmental Stewardship funding, by which time Knepp was supporting some 1% of all nesting nightingales in the UK, only 9 years into the project.

By 2011 there were eleven singing male turtle doves at Knepp. 2016 saw the first pair of breeding falcons. In the same year, work was carried out on the River Adur within the project boundaries to remove the artificial banks and allow the river to flood the surrounding meadows in a more natural way. In 2012 the Environment Agency removed the largest weir and disabled the rest, and within a year Sea Trout were spotted migrating up the river.

In 2016 a black stork, one of the rarest birds in Western Europe, was spotted, and 441 species of moth were recorded. Between 2015 and 2016 experts recorded 62 species of bee and 30 species of wasp, including 7 bee and 4 wasp species of national conservation importance.

White stork were observed raising chicks in UK for the first time in 600 years at Knepp in 2020.
 
Beaver were re-introduced to Knepp in February 2020, having been absent from Sussex for several hundred years. One of the beavers escaped in December that year.

Description

The project uses herds of free-roaming animals including Old English longhorn cattle, Exmoor ponies, Tamworth pigs, red deer and fallow deer to drive habitat generation and focuses on restoring dynamic natural processes. The project has witnessed an 'extraordinary abundance' of many rare species, including turtle doves, barbastelle bats, slow-worms and grass snakes; and is now a breeding hotspot for purple emperor butterflies and nightingales.

A reintroduction programme of white storks to England is in its early stages on the estate, with juvenile birds being kept in a six and a half acre pen until maturity, when they will be released. Sussex was chosen for its strong historical associations with the stork. The programme aims to establish a breeding population in Britain for the first time since 1416.

The estate is still farming, albeit far more extensively, producing 75 tonnes of low-input, organic, pasture-fed meat per annum from its free-roaming herds. Wildlife tourism provides another significant income stream.

	
Knepp offers camping, safaris and holiday accommodation. There are 16 miles of public and permissive footpaths and 5 viewing platforms on the estate.

The Knepp Wildland Advisory Board consists of some thirty ecologists, including Dr Frans Vera, and Prof Sir John Lawton, author of the 2010 'Making Space for Nature' report.

The story of the Knepp Wildland project is told in the 2018 book Wilding: The Return of Nature to a British Farm which is written by Isabella Tree, who lives at Knepp and is married to Charles Burrell and helped create the Wildland project.

Awards and recognition
 2015 People Environment Achievement (PEA) award for Nature
 2015 Innovative & Novel Project award in the UK River Prize for the River Adur restoration project
 2017 Anders Wall Award for special contribution to the rural environment in the European Union
 2017 Gold, Best Guided Tour of the Year, Beautiful South Awards
 The Knepp Wildland project is recognised as a Verified Conservation Area (VCA) and is a member of the Rewilding Europe Network.
 Outstanding example of landscape-scale restoration in the UK Government's 25 Year Environment Plan.
 Organic certification from the Soil Association
Sir Charles Burrell is Chair of the Beaver Advisory Committee for England and Foundation Conservation Carpathia, vice-chair for Rewilding Britain and on the board of The Arcadia Fund, Ingleby Farms Environment Committee, the Endangered Landscapes Programme and the Bronze Oak Project.

Criticism
According to Isabella Tree, early on the project received letters "complaining that rewilding was an immoral waste of land, an affront to cultural values, that we’d turned our home Knepp into an eyesore of noxious weeds and brambles."

Gallery

See also
Rewilding Britain
Wood-pasture hypothesis

References

External links 

 Knepp Wildland Project Homepage https://knepp.co.uk/home

Sources

Nature reserves in England
Nature reserves in West Sussex
Rewilding
Environmentalism in England